Omobranchus fasciolatus, the Arab blenny or barred Arab blenny, is a species of combtooth blenny found in the western Indian ocean. This species can reach a maximum length of  TL.

References

fasciolatus
Taxa named by Achille Valenciennes
Fish described in 1836